20 Greatest Hits is a compilation album by Kenny Rogers released by Liberty Records in 1983.

Overview 

20 Greatest Hits marks Rogers' third compilation album as a solo artist.  This compilation covers the entire span of Rogers' glorious chart run through the late 1970s and early 1980s.

Among the 20 tracks on the album is Rogers' early smash hit "Lucille", which made Rogers a world-famous solo superstar.  "The Gambler" – Rogers' chart-topping story song – also makes an appearance.  The single that first appeared on Rogers' first solo Greatest Hits collection in 1980, "Lady" also makes it onto the album, as does "Love Lifted Me" from 1976 (his first solo single in ten years following his split with The First Edition).

Also included are popular duets with Sheena Easton ("We've Got Tonight"), Kim Carnes ("Don't Fall in Love with a Dreamer"), and Dottie West ("Till I Can Make It on My Own").

Based on hit singles from the Billboard charts, this is the strongest Kenny Rogers single disc compilation album released. Another version came in 1987 (see below). It was also re-released on CD in 1994.

Track listing

Chart performance

Year-end charts

Reissue

In 1987, Liberty issued a new disc featuring five additional tracks, covering Rogers' newest hits up to that point.  The new tracks are the last five, including the title single "Love Is What We Make It" and "Sweet Music Man", the latter penned by Rogers himself.

Track listing 
Track times differ from the 1983 release and all tracks are re-presented here.

 Lucille
 Lady
 Love Lifted Me
 We've Got Tonight
 Scarlet Fever
 Love or Something Like It
 She Believes in Me
 Ruby, Don't Take Your Love to Town
 Don't Fall in Love With a Dreamer
 You Were a Good Friend
 Gambler
 Through the Years
 Daytime Friends
 You Decorated My Life
 'Til I Can Make It on My Own
 Reuben James
 Coward of the County
 I Don't Need You
 Something's Burning
 Love Will Turn You Around
 Abraham, Martin and John/Precious Memories
 Love Is What We Make It
 Green, Green Grass of Home
 Desperado
 Sweet Music Man

References

Kenny Rogers compilation albums
1983 greatest hits albums
Liberty Records compilation albums